The men's super combined competition at the 2013 World Championships was held on Monday, 11 February. 53 athletes from 25 nations competed.

Results
The downhill race was started at 12:00 and the slalom race at 18:15.

References

External links
  
 FIS-Ski.com - AWSC 2013 - calendar & results

Men's super combined